Anton Caraiman (Caraman) (1879, Izvoare, Pohrebeni, Orhei, Bessarabia after 1918) was a peasant and Bessarabian politician.

Biography 
He served as Member of the Moldovan Parliament (1917–1918). On 27 March 1918 Anton Caraiman voted for the Union of Bessarabia with Romania.

Gallery

Bibliography 
Gheorghe E. Cojocaru, Sfatul Țării: itinerar, Civitas, Chişinău, 1998, 
Mihai Taşcă, Sfatul Țării şi actualele autorităţi locale, "Timpul de dimineaţă", no. 114 (849), June 27, 2008 (page 16)

External links 
 Arhiva pentru Sfatul Tarii
 Deputaţii Sfatului Ţării şi Lavrenti Beria

Notes

Moldovan MPs 1917–1918
People from Orhei District
1879 births
Year of death missing
People from the Russian Empire